Leonard Shure (April 10, 1910 in Los Angeles – February 28, 1995 in Nantucket, Massachusetts) was an American concert pianist. He began his career as a performer at the age of 5 and as a teenager studied privately with Artur Schnabel in Germany.

Life
Shure graduated from the Hochschule für Musik in Berlin in 1927, at which time he made his debut in Germany. He served as Schnabel's first and only assistant until 1933.

Shure returned to the United States in 1933 and made his first concert appearance in New York City with the Boston Symphony Orchestra, Serge Koussevitsky conducting.

He was a featured soloist with virtually every major symphony orchestra in the United States, including the New York Philharmonic, the Detroit, St. Louis, Pittsburgh Symphony Orchestras, and on numerous occasions, with the Cleveland Orchestra under the direction of George Szell.

In 1941 Shure became the first pianist to perform at the Berkshire Music Festival in Tanglewood, when he appeared there with Dr. Koussevitsky and the Boston Symphony Orchestra. In 1946 he performed the complete Beethoven sonata cycle with violinist Henri Temianka at the Library of Congress in Washington D.C. He also performed with such eminent conductors as William Steinberg, Leonard Bernstein and Dimitri Mitropoulos. In 1979 Shure made a successful tour of the Soviet Union.

Shure taught at the Cleveland Institute of Music, the University of Texas, Boston University, and the Mannes School of Music in New York. In the summers of 1966 and 1967, Shure gave the first applied music courses ever offered at Harvard University. He spent two summers at the Rubin Academy in Jerusalem, and four summers in Aspen, Colorado. Late in life, Shure was a member of the faculty at the New England Conservatory of Music.

Discography 
 "Leonard Shure - Beethoven", 33 Variations on a Waltz by Diabelli CD 72001 AudioFon
 "Leonard Shure - Schubert Piano Sonatas" CD 72010 AudioFon
 "Beethoven - Emperor Concerto; Schumann - Fantasia in C"  Leonard Shure (piano), Leon Fleisher (conductor), The New England Conservatory Orchestra - The Schnabel Memorial Concert CD 72018 AudioFon
 "Leonard Shure - Beethoven Piano Sonatas" CD 72005 AudioFon
 "Leonard Shure - Brahms, Schubert, Chopin" CD 72016 AudioFon
 "Beethoven 10 Sonatas for Violin & Piano," the 1946 performances with Henri Temianka restored by DOREMI Legendary Treasures DHR-8011-3

References

External links
Artist tribute website
Artist tribute Facebook
Artist tribute Twitter

American classical pianists
Male classical pianists
American male pianists
Cleveland Institute of Music faculty
University of Texas at Austin faculty
Boston University faculty
Harvard University faculty
New England Conservatory faculty
The New School faculty
1995 deaths
1910 births
Musicians from Los Angeles County, California
Berlin University of the Arts alumni
Pupils of Artur Schnabel
20th-century classical pianists
20th-century American pianists
Classical musicians from California
20th-century American male musicians